Under False Flag (Swedish: Under falsk flagg) is a 1935 Swedish comedy film directed by Gustaf Molander and starring Ernst Eklund, Tutta Rolf and Allan Bohlin.

The film's sets were designed by the art director Arne Åkermark.

Cast

See also
 A Man with Heart (1932)

References

Bibliography 
 Per Olov Qvist & Peter von Bagh. Guide to the Cinema of Sweden and Finland. Greenwood Publishing Group, 2000.

External links 
 

1935 films
Swedish comedy films
1935 comedy films
1930s Swedish-language films
Films directed by Gustaf Molander
Remakes of German films
Swedish films based on plays
Swedish black-and-white films
1930s Swedish films